EGTC can represent:
EGTC, the International Civil Aviation Organization airport code for Cranfield Airport in England
EGTC, a European grouping of territorial cooperation
EGTC, the transliterated Russian acronym for the Unified Deep Water System of European Russia